Santa Cruz Looff Carousel and Roller Coaster On The Beach Boardwalk is a National Historic Landmark composed of two parts, a Looff carousel and the Giant Dipper wooden roller coaster, at the Santa Cruz Beach Boardwalk in Santa Cruz, California, United States.  They are among the oldest surviving beachfront amusement park attractions on the west coast of the United States.  They were listed as a pair as a National Historic Landmark in 1987.

Background

The Santa Cruz Beach Boardwalk is located on the northern shore of Monterey Bay, south of Beach Street and just west of the mouth of the San Lorenzo River. The family-friendly amusement park was founded in 1907 by Fred W. Swanton, and has been in continuous operation since then. Early attractions included a natatorium, casino (in the old sense of the word, a place of entertainment), and a short railroad with hills. The Looff Carousel was purchased new from the Charles I. D. Looff factory in Long Beach, California in 1911, and the Giant Dipper rollercoaster followed in 1924. It was built by Charles Looff's son Arthur.

The Looff family was one of the major early manufacturers of carousels, including this 1911 example. Only five other intact Looff carousels remain in the United States. The Giant Dipper is the older of the two large, wooden scaffolded roller coasters remaining on the West Coast; the other is the Giant Dipper at Belmont Park in San Diego.

Looff Carousel

The Looff Carousel is located near the Riverside Avenue entrance to the park. The carousel has 73 unique horses and two chariots or seats, and is a 'pure' carousel asall the horses were carved by one master carver. The Looff Carousel is one of six remaining intact in the United States.

The carousel includes a brass ring dispenser. Riders on the outside jumping horses can reach out and try to grab rings which then get tossed at the target which is a large clown's mouth. It was originally manually operated but was mechanized around 1950. It is one of only twenty ring dispensers still operating in the world. Sometimes, riders keep the rings to remember their visit.

The carousel also has three organs: the original 342-pipe Ruth & Sohn organ from 1894, a Wurlitzer 165 organ from 2007, and a Wurlitzer 146 organ from 2011.

Giant Dipper

The Giant Dipper is a classic wooden roller coaster, located astride the LeBrandt Avenue entrance to the park. The track is colored red with white supports. When built in 1924,  of lumber was used. The track is inspected every two hours.

References

National Historic Landmarks in California
Buildings and structures in Santa Cruz County, California
Santa Cruz, California
Santa Cruz Beach Boardwalk
Carousels on the National Register of Historic Places in California
National Register of Historic Places in Santa Cruz County, California